Brixen (or ) is a town in South Tyrol, northern Italy, located about  north of Bolzano.

Geography
Brixen is the third largest city and oldest town in the province, with a population of nearly twenty-three thousand. It is located at the confluence of the Eisack and Rienz rivers, and today it is the capital of the Eisack district community.

The Brenner Pass, on the Italian-Austrian border, is 45 km to the north of Brixen, and Bolzano lies 40 km to the south. To the east lies the Plose mountain massif with three peaks, the closest of which being the Telegraph peak (Monte Telegrafo) (2,486m), formally known as Fröllspitze. On the western side, there is the Königsangerspitze mountain (Monte Pascolo) (2,439m) and the Pfeffersberg slope (Monteponente), both of which are located within the Sartnal Alps.

Brixen is especially known for its skiing, with a major ski resort, the Plose.

Frazioni
Brixen is made up of about 22 smaller villages and hamlets called Frazioni. They include: Afers/Eores, Albeins/Albes, Elvas, Gereuth/Caredo, Karnol/Cornale, Klerant/Cleran, Kranebitt/Costa d'Elvas, Mahr/Elvas La Mara, Mairdorf/Villa, Mellaun/Meluno, Milland/Millan, Pairdorf/Perara, Pinzagen/Pinzago, Plabach/Rivapiana, Rutzenberg/Monte Ruzzo, Sarns/Sarnes, St. Andrä/Sant'Andrea, St. Leonhard/San Leonardo, Tils/Tiles, Tötschling/Tecelinga, Tschötsch/Scezze, and Untereben.

History
The area of Brixen has been settled since the Upper Paleolithic (8th millennium BC). Other settlements from the late Stone Age have been found and in 15 BC, the area was conquered by the Romans, who had their main settlement in the nearby Säben (Sabiona). They held it until around 590, when it was occupied by Bavarians.

The first mention of Brixen dates to 901 in a document issued by the King of Germany, Louis III the Child, in which the farm of Prihsna was presented to Bishop Zacharias of Säben. As time passed, 'Prihsna' turned into the current name of Brixen. The bishops moved here from Säben in 992, after the cathedral had been finished.

In 1048, the Bishop of Brixen, Poppo, was made pontiff as Pope Damasus II by emperor Henry III. His reign was especially short, lasting only 23 days before dying. Rumours circulated that Poppo had been poisoned by Gerhard Brazutus, an ally to both Pope Benedict IX, whom Poppo had just dethroned, and to be Pope Gregory VII. These claims have not proven to be substantial and a modern conjecture suggests he died of malaria.

On 15 June 1080, at the request of Henry III, the synod of Brixen condemned Pope Gregory VII over the Investiture Controversy, a conflict during the 11th and 12th century over the ability to appoint bishops.

In 1115, a first line of walls encircling Brixen was completed. In 1174, and later again in 1234 and 1445, Brixen was devastated by fires.

During the German mediatisation in 1802, Brixen was awarded to the Austrian Empire, only to be ceded to the Bavarians in 1805 after the Austrians suffered a great loss to Naploen and his Allies at the Battle of Austerlitz. The Bavarians set up the District Court of Brixen, a regional judicial and administrative court for South Tyrol. The court only lasted nine years before in 1814, the Congress of Vienna returned Brixen to the Austrians.

Some time between 1851 and 1855, the Czech journalist and writer Karel Havlíček Borovský was exiled to Brixen by the Austrian government.

In 1866, after the Austro-Prussian War, the Austrians were on the verge of collapse. So in 1867 the Austro-Hungarian Compromise was arranged, Austria was to became Cisleithania, a constituent of Austria-Hungary, of which Brixen was now a part of too.

In 1915, the Treaty of London was concluded, its objective would be, in part, to entice Italy to join the Triple Entente. One section, Article 4, promised the Italians the Austrian territory of South Tyrol, in order to create a new Italian-Austrian frontier. In 1919, after the victories of the allies, Brixen, according to the Treaty of Saint-Germain-en-Laye, had officially fallen to Italy along with the rest of South Tyrol.

Under Mussolini, Brixen and the surrounding villages experienced an enormous growth, as part of the fascist effort to consolidate territorial subdivisions in the country. In 1928 this included the addition of Milland, Sarns, and Albeins, as well as Elvas and Kranebitt which were annexed from Natz, a neighbouring municipality.

During WW2, the Austrians attempted to reclaim South Tyrol but were unsuccessful.

After the war, Austria deemed the post-war treaty to be unsatisfactory, raising The South Tyrolean Question (Die Südtirolfrage). The Austrians believed, along with the South Tyroleans, that the region should be autonomous to protect minorities. South Tyrol has 69.4% native German speaking population, and a 4.5% native Ladin speaking population, with the two languages making up a majority in 111 out of the 116 municipalities in South Tyrol.

In 1972 South Tyrol, as a part of Trentino-Alto Adige/Südtirol, was granted autonomy.

Coat-of-arms
The oldest coat of arms dates back to 1297 with the lamb, known then from 1304 as a symbol of the lamb. On 13 November 1928, a shield with the city walls and a gate on the lawn in the upper half and the lamb in the lower was adopted. The emblem is a turned argent lamb with an or halo on a gules background; the right foreleg supports a flag with a gules cross. The emblem was granted in 1966.

Main sights
 The Cathedral (10th century), dedicated to the Assumption of Mary, was rebuilt in the 13th century and again in 1745–54 along Baroque lines. The ceiling of the nave has a large fresco by Paul Troger portraying the Adoration of the Lamb.
 The Hofburg, a Renaissance Bishop's Palace (started in the 13th century), one of the main noble residences in South Tyrol. The Diocesan Museum has several artworks, including a presepe with 5,000 figures created for Bishop Karl Franz Lodron.
 The round parish church of Saint Michael (11th century). The Gothic choir and the bell tower are from the 15th century while the nave is from the 16th. The main artwork is a wooden Cireneus from the 15th century.
 The Pharmacy Museum (Pharmaziemuseum Brixen), located in a nearly 500-year-old townhouse, shows the development and changes of the local pharmacy.  The Peer family (now the 7th generation) has run this pharmacy since 1787, always in the same location. The museum's carefully restored rooms illustrate the development of the pharmaceutical profession over the centuries and the changes in remedies used, from the testicles of a beaver and pieces of an ancient Egyptian mummy to modern plasters and lyophilisates. All the objects and medicines on display were in use over the centuries. The Museum also has a library for historical research and the archive of the Peer family. In a separate room there is a multimedia display of the history of the family.
The White Tower (also known as "Weißer Turm") was completed in 1591, but subsequently modified. The 72 meter tall tower, which is located next to the parish church of Saint Michael, is inside the city walls in the historic center of Brixen. It contains a complex carillon mechanism of 43 bells, which ring every day at 11.00 a.m. and can play more than a hundred different tunes. On the top floor there is a large roof  where it is possible to observe the circumstances. The Tower also has a lunar clock. The architecture of the tower belongs to the Gothic Architecture and is one of the few remaining in South Tyrol. It is the cultural heritage monument with the number 14186 in South Tyrol. The White Tower is used as a museum since 2007.

Outside the city is Rodeneck Castle, one of the most powerful of its time. It has precious frescoes from the early 13th century. Also important are Reifenstein Castle and Trostburg Castle in Waidbruck. In the latter lived the adventurer and minstrel Oswald von Wolkenstein.

Gallery

Society

Linguistic distribution
According to the 2011 census, the majority of the population speaks German as first language (72.82%). The remainder of the inhabitants speak Italian and Ladin as first languages, with percentages of 25.84% and 1.34%, respectively.

Culture

The rock band, Frei.Wild, has its origin in Brixen.

Notable people 
 Maria Hueber (1653-1705) - religious sister, pioneer in educating girls in the Tyrol
 Matteo Goffriller (1659–1742) - Venetian luthier, particularly noted for the quality of his cellos
 Anton Pichler (1697–1779) - Tyrolean goldsmith and artist of engraved gems
 Joseph Ambrose Stapf (1785-1844) - professor of moral theology, pedagogy at Brixen seminary
 Jakob Philipp Fallmerayer (1790–1861) - traveller, journalist, politician and historian.
 Johanna von Isser Großrubatscher (1802-1880) - graphic artist and writer
 Josef Murr (1864–1932) - classical philologist and botanist
 Eduard Thöny (1866-1950) - caricaturist and illustrator 
 Fritz Tarbuk von Sensenhorst (1896–1976) - lieutenant in the Austro-Hungarian Navy, captain in the army and an entrepreneur
 Mary de Rachewiltz (born 1925) - poet and translator
 Reinhold Messner (born 1944) - mountaineer, adventurer, explorer, author and politician
 Heinz Winkler (born 1949) - three-Michelin star chef
 Herbert Dorfmann (born 1969) - agronomist and Member of the European Parliament

Sport 
 Denise Karbon (born 1980) - World Cup alpine ski racer
 Roland Fischnaller (born 1980) - snowboarder at the 2002, 2006, 2010, 2014, 2018 and 2022 Winter Olympics
 Karin Oberhofer (born 1985) - biathlete, bronze medallist in the Mixed relay at the 2014 Winter Olympics
 Dorothea Wierer (born 1990) - biathlete and former world champion
 Ludwig Rieder (born 1991) - luger, competitor at the 2014 Winter Olympics
 Dominik Fischnaller (born 1993) - luger, bronze medallist at the 2022 Winter Olympics
 Kevin Fischnaller (born 1993) - luger, competitor at the 2018 Winter Olympics

Transport
Brixen has a railway station on the Brenner Railway, which connects the town to Verona and Innsbruck. It has an individual fare structure for public transport within the Tirol-Südtirol zone.

Italy

Regional Train (Trenitalia Regional): Brennero/Brenner - Fortezza/Franzensfeste - Bressanone/Brixen - Chiusa/Klausen - Bolzano/Bozen - Trento - Rovereto - Verona - Isola della Scala - Nogara - Bologna

Germany/Austria/South Tyrol

(D for Germany, A for Austria)

On 11 December 2016, ÖBB took over Deutsche Bahn's night trains. The Munich-Milan service was withdrawn.

Night Train (DB CityNightLine) Munich-Milan/Rome: Munich (D) - Kufstein (A) - Jenbach (A) - Innsbruck (A) - Brixen/Bressanone - Bolzano/Bozen - Trento/Trient - Verona - Peschiera del Garda - Brescia - Milan
Intercity Train (ÖBB Eurocity) Munich-Verona/Venice: Munich (D) - Kufstein (A) - Jenbach (A) - Innsbruck (A) - Brenner/Brennero - Franzensfeste/Fortezza - Brixen/Bressanone - Bolzano/Bozen - Trento - Rovereto - Verona - Padua - Venice
Intercity Train (ÖBB Eurocity) Munich-Verona/Bologna: Munich (D) - Kufstein (A) - Jenbach (A) - Innsbruck (A) - Brenner/Brennero - Franzensfeste/Fortezza - Brixen/Bressanone - Bolzano/Bozen - Trento - Rovereto - Verona - Bologna
Regional Train (Südtirol Bahn Regio-Express) Bolzano/Bozen-Innsbruck: Bolzano/Bozen - Brixen/Bressanone - Franzensfeste/Fortezza - Sterzing/Vipiteno - Brenner/Brennero - Innsbruck
Regional Train (Südtirol Bahn Regio) Brixen/Bressanone-Lienz: Brixen/Bressanone - Franzensfeste/Fortezza - Mühlbach/Rio di Pusteria - Vintl/Vandoies - Ehrenburg/Casteldarne - St. Lorenzen/San Lorenzo di Sebato - Bruneck/Brunico - Olang/Valdaora - Welsberg/Monguelfo - Niederdorf/Villabassa - Toblach/Dobbiaco - Innichen/San Candido - Lienz (A)
 Train connects at Verona with ÖBB EuroNight Rome-Vienna: DB CityNightLine splits into two trains (first half couples with ÖBB Rome-Vienna and leaves for Vienna or Rome; second half continues to Munich or Milan). Vienna-Rome splits into two trains (first half continues to Rome or Vienna; second half couples with DB CityNightLine for Milan or Munich).

By road, the town has two exits on the Brenner Autobahn that connects Brixen to the Brenner Pass.

Twin towns - sister cities
Brixen is twinned with:
 Bled, Slovenia, since 2004
 Havlíčkův Brod, Czech Republic, since 1992
 Regensburg, Germany, since 1969

Sports
Brixen hosted the 2009 World Youth Championships in Athletics.
Brixen hosted the 16th Unicycle World Convention and Championships (UNICON) in July 2012.

References

Further reading
 Leo Andergassen, Der Dom zu Brixen. Geschichte, Raum, Kunst. Bozen: Verlagsanstalt Athesia 2009. 
 
 Helmut Flachenecker, Hans Heiss, Hannes Obermair (eds), Stadt und Hochstift, Brixen, Bruneck und Klausen bis zur Säkularisation 1803 – Città e Principato, Bressanone, Brunico e Chiusa fino alla secolarizzazione 1803 (= Veröffentlichungen des Südtiroler Landesarchivs 12). Bozen: Verlagsanstalt Athesia 2000. 
 Barbara Fuchs, Hans Heiss, Carlo Milesi, Brixen. Die Geschichte. Kunst, Kultur, Gesellschaft. 2 vols. Bozen: Athesia/Tappeiner 2004–06 
 Ludwig Tavernier, Der Dombezirk von Brixen im Mittelalter. Gestalt, Funktion, Bedeutung (= Schlern-Schriften 294). Innsbruck: Universitätsverlag Wagner 1996.

External links

  Homepage of the municipality
  Photos from Brixen 
  WebCam picture from Bressanone - Brixen

 
Municipalities of South Tyrol